This is a list of English language words that come from the Niger-Congo languages. 
It excludes placenames except where they have become common words.

Bantu origin
banjo – probably Bantu mbanza
basenji – breed of dog from the Congo
boma – probably from Swahili
bwana – from Swahili, meaning an important person or safari leader
chimpanzee – loaned in the 18th century from a Bantu language, possibly Kivili ci-mpenzi.
dengue – possibly from Swahili dinga
goober – possibly from Bantu (Kikongo and Kimbundu nguba)
gumbo – from Bantu (Kimbundu ngombo meaning "okra")
impala – from Zulu im-pala
impi – from Zulu language meaning war, battle or a regiment
indaba – from Xhosa or Zulu languages – 'stories' or 'news' typically conflated with 'meeting' (often used in South African English)
isango – Zulu meaning gateway
jumbo – from Swahili (jambo or jumbe or from Kongo nzamba "elephant")
kalimba
Kwanzaa – recent coinage (Maulana Karenga 1965) as the name of a  "specifically African-American holiday", abstracted from a Swahili phrase matunda ya kwanza, meaning "first fruits [of the harvest]".
lapa – from Sotho languages – enclosure or barbecue area (often used in South African English)
macaque – from Bantu makaku through Portuguese and French
mamba – from Zulu or Swahili mamba
marimba – from Bantu (Kimbundu and Swahili marimba, malimba)
okapi – from a language in the Congo
safari – from Swahili travel, ultimately from Arabic
sangoma – from Zulu – traditional healer (often used in South African English)
tilapia – Possibly a latinization "thiape", the Tswana word for fish.
tsetse – from a Bantu language (Tswana tsetse, Luhya )
ubuntu – Nguni term for "mankind; humanity", in South Africa since the 1980s also used capitalized, Ubuntu, as the name of a philosophy or ideology of "human kindness" or "humanism".
vuvuzela – musical instrument, name of Zulu or Nguni origin
zebra – of unknown origin, recorded since c. 1600, possibly from a Congolese language, or alternatively from Amharic.
zombie – likely from West African (compare Kikongo zumbi "fetish", Kimbundu nzambi "god")

Non-Bantu West African origin
azawakh - probably from Fula or Tuareg. A breed of dogs from West and North Africa
banana – West African, possibly Wolof banana
bongo – West African boungu
buckra – "white man or person", from Efik and Ibibio mbakara
chigger – possibly from Wolof and/or Yoruba jiga "insect"
cola – from West African languages (Temne kola, Mandinka kolo)
djembe – from West African languages
jazz – from West African languages (Mandinka jasi, Temne yas)
jive – possibly from Wolof jev
juke, jukebox – possibly from Wolof and Bambara  through Gullah
kwashiorkor – from Ga language, Coastal Ghana meaning "swollen stomach"
Marímbula, plucked musical instrument (lamellophone) of the Caribbean islands
merengue (dance) possibly from Fulani  meaning to shake or quiver
mumbo jumbo – from Mandingo name Maamajombo, a masked dancer
mojo – from Kongo “moyo” meaning “spirit”
obeah – from West African (Efik ubio, Twi ebayifo)
okra – from Igbo ókùrù
sambo – Fula sambo meaning "uncle"
tango – probably from Ibibio 
tote – West African via Gullah
vodou – from West African languages (Ewe and Fon vodu "spirit")
yam – West African (Fula nyami, Twi anyinam)

References

Notes

Sources
Online Etymology Dictionary
Common words of African origin-William Megenney, University of California, Riverside
The Impact of African Languages on American English
African American Vernacular English Vocabulary
English words have African roots

Niger-Congo
Niger–Congo languages